Hock Lai Lee (born 20 March 1987) is a Malaysian-born American badminton player. Lee started his junior career as a Malaysian player based in Penang. In junior event, he won the Pahang Open tournament in the boys' singles event. He also represented Malaysia at the 2005 Asian Junior Championships and win bronze medal in the boys' team event. He won the men's singles title at the U.S. National Badminton Championships in 2010 and 2013. At the BWF International tournament, he won double title at the 2009 Miami Pan Am International in the men's singles and mixed doubles event.

Achievements

BWF International Challenge/Series
Men's Singles

Men's Doubles

Mixed Doubles

 BWF International Challenge tournament
 BWF International Series tournament
 BWF Future Series tournament

References

External links
 

Living people
1987 births
Sportspeople from Penang
American male badminton players
American sportspeople of Chinese descent
American people of Malaysian descent
Malaysian emigrants to the United States
Malaysian sportspeople of Chinese descent
Malaysian male badminton players